Morašice may refer to places in the Czech Republic:

Morašice (Chrudim District), a municipality and village in the Pardubice Region
Morašice (Pardubice District), a municipality and village in the Pardubice Region
Morašice (Svitavy District), a municipality and village in the Pardubice Region
Morašice (Znojmo District), a municipality and village in the South Moravian Region